General Paramasiva Prabhakar Kumaramangalam,  (1 July 1913 – 13 March 2000) was the 6th Chief of the Army Staff (COAS) of the Indian Army from 1967 to 1969. He was one of the last British-trained King's Commissioned Indian Officer (KCIO) to serve in the Indian Army, and the last KCIO to lead the Indian Army.

Early life and education
Kumaramangalam was born to P. Subbarayan, who served as Chief Minister of the Madras Presidency between 1926 and 1930, and was a member of the zamindari family of Kumaramangalam from Thiruchengode Taluk, Namakkal District, Tamil Nadu. 

He was educated at the preparatory St Hugh's School (then in Kent), and at Eton College. He then studied at the Royal Military Academy, Woolwich, and was commissioned into the British Indian Army as an unattached second lieutenant in 1933. He was appointed to the British Indian Army on the 12th of November, 1934.

Military life

World War II
During World War II, he was awarded the Distinguished Service Order (DSO) as a temporary major for action in Libya on 27 May 1942 at Point 171, south of Bir Hakiem commanding the 7th Field Battery, 2nd Field Regiment, Indian Artillery.

The citation recommending Kumaramangalam for a Distinguished Service Order runs as follows:

4 June 1942

Captain (Ty. Major) PARAMASIVA PRABHAKAR KUMARAMANGALAM (IA 1282),  2nd Indian Field Regiment, 3rd Indian Motor Brigade

For great courage and devotion to duty.

On 27 May 1942 during the action which took place 3 miles S.E. of BIR HACHEIM, Major Kumaramangalam showed great bravery in controlling the fire of his battery under heavy enemy fire. He continually encouraged the gun detachments, and by his cool demeanour in the face of machine gun and anti-tank fire from enemy tanks undoubtedly inspired his men with the confidence with which they withstood the final tank attack. When one of his troops was over run and captured, he acquired an armoured car left at the position and tried to drive the Italian tanks away which were encircling it. Subsequently he led a patrol back to the position and recovered three guns. 

He was taken Prisoner of War (PoW) by the Italians later in 1942 and held in a PoW camp in Italy. With the Italian Armistice in September 1943 he escaped on 19 November; however, he was captured again in January 1944 and imprisoned, this time in Germany, where he was transferred to Stalag Luft III, a high security camp for PoWs. At the end of the war in 1945, he returned to India.

Postwar
On 18 April 1946, Kumaramangalam was appointed a Member of the Order of the British Empire (MBE). He became an acting Brigadier in 1948, with the substantive rank of lieutenant-colonel, and was promoted to the substantive rank of colonel on 2 February 1951. As a brigadier, he was appointed to command a paratroop brigade on 14 February 1955, and was given command of an infantry division on 9 September 1956, with the acting rank of major-general.

Kumaramangalam was promoted to substantive major-general on 1 August 1958,  and appointed the Commandant of the Defence Services Staff College on 25 February 1959.  He was appointed Adjutant-General on 5 October 1959, with the acting rank of lieutenant-general. Promoted lieutenant-general on 8 May 1961, he took over as General Officer Commanding, Eastern Command on 1 May 1963, with appointment as GOC-in-C, Eastern Command on 4 April 1964.  On 16 November 1964 he was appointed Deputy Chief of the Army Staff followed by appointment as Vice Chief of the Army Staff on 15 January 1965. General Kumaramangalam took over as the Chief of the Army Staff on 8 June 1966, the first Indian gunner officer and paratrooper to reach this coveted appointment. The tenure of General Kumaramangalam as Chief of the Army Staff was marked by an unpublicised but exhaustive re-organisation of the service, up-gradation of weapons, training and tactics based on the lessons learned from the 1965 War. He served in the Indian Army with distinction for 36 years until his retirement on 7 June 1969. He received the Padma Vibushan in 1970.

Views on America

General Kumaramangalam trained at the artillery school in Fort Sill, Oklahoma. From his letters it is evident he was not very impressed with the Americans. He saw them as suffering from an "aggressive inferiority complex" and cautioned a newly independent India against coming under American influence. The following is an excerpt from a letter written by him to C. Rajagopalachari in 1947:

 "This country is not one that I will ever get fond of. I have not got a very high opinion of them. The people that I have to deal with are very kind, hospitable and have been very good to the two of us. But somehow I feel there is a trace of artificiality in that and also it is the result of trying to impress one. They I think are very jealous of the old world and its background and culture and this results in an aggressive inferiority complex. As for their state of morality, there is none. People seem to delight in trying to outwit each other by any means, mainly crooked. The politicians are racketeers and big business has a tight grip on everything in the country. The small country trader and the farmer I think have their hands securely tied by the big men. I do hope that our country proceeds with caution and doesn't get entirely under the influence of the States."

Other interests
He was also a polo player, horseman, show jumper, and cricketer. He was a member of the Marylebone Cricket Club, a fellow of the Royal Horticultural Society, and president of Indian Polo Association and Equestrian Federation of India. On retirement as army chief, he was elected President of the World Wildlife Fund - India (WWF-India) during its formative stages.

Death
He died following a heart attack on 13 March 2000.

Awards and decorations

Dates of rank

See also
Chief of Army Staff of the Indian Army

Notes

References

1913 births
2000 deaths
People educated at Eton College
Graduates of the Royal Military Academy, Woolwich
Chiefs of Army Staff (India)
Vice Chiefs of Army Staff (India)
Companions of the Distinguished Service Order
Recipients of the Padma Vibhushan in civil service
Members of the Order of the British Empire
Paramasiva
Indian Army personnel of World War II
Indian prisoners of war
World War II prisoners of war held by Italy
Indian escapees
Escapees from Italian detention
World War II prisoners of war held by Germany
British Indian Army officers
Indian generals
Fellows of the Royal Horticultural Society
Indian Members of the Order of the British Empire
Indian Companions of the Distinguished Service Order
Commandants of Defence Services Staff College